Maestro António Fortunato de Figueiredo ComSE (20 August 1903 – 1981) was a Goan conductor and violinist. He was India's first conductor of western classical music.

Early life and education
António Fortunato de Figueiredo was born in Nacordá-Loutolim, in Goa (Portuguese India), the son of Goan Catholic parents Gabriel de Figueiredo and Ermelinda Parras e Figueiredo.  He learnt the first rudiments of music at a primary school under a local teacher. Whilst studying at the lyceum of Panjim, he learnt the violin and soon became an accomplished player. 

He went to Portugal in 1927 to pursue an arts degree at the University of Lisbon, but transferred to the National Conservatory of Lisbon, graduating with a higher education degree in violin in 1932. He then proceeded to Paris to study at the Faculty of Music and Musicology of the University of Paris.

Career
On his return to Goa in 1936, António was appointed the choir-master at the lyceum of Panjim. He organised and directed choral groups and string ensembles which staged many performances in Loutolim and Panjim, most of them in aid of charity foundations. 

Soon after founding the Goa Symphony Orchestra, Figueiredo convinced the Portuguese government to found the Music Academy of Portuguese India, modelled on the lines of the National Conservatory of Lisbon.

Figueiredo gave a number of lectures on music and history of music which were broadcast by Goa's Portuguese Radio and later by the All India Radio, Panjim under their Portuguese programme Renascença, at the Institute Menezes Braganza, and Clube Nacional.

Honours
Figueiredo was made Knight of the Order of St. James of the Sword in 1961. He also received accolades from the Institute Menezes Braganza and the Rotary Club.

External links
Biography (in Portuguese)
An article by Fernando do Rego (in Portuguese)
Homenageado em Pangim no centenário do seu nascimento (in Portuguese)
Sessão de homenagem ao Maestro António de Figueiredo (in Portuguese)
An article by Ben Antão

1903 births
1981 deaths
University of Paris alumni
Indian conductors (music)
People from South Goa district
Goan music
Musicians from Goa
20th-century conductors (music)
20th-century Indian musicians
Portuguese Indian expatriates in France